Mesachorutes is a genus of springtails in the family Hypogastruridae. There are at least two described species in Mesachorutes.

Species
These two species belong to the genus Mesachorutes:
 Mesachorutes quadriocellatus Absolon, 1900 i c g
 Mesachorutes thomomys (Chamberlain, 1943) i c g
Data sources: i = ITIS, c = Catalogue of Life, g = GBIF, b = Bugguide.net

References

Further reading

 
 
 

Collembola